The City Rail Link (CRL) is a rail project currently under construction in Auckland, New Zealand. The project consists of a 3.5 km long double-track rail tunnel underneath Auckland's city centre, between Waitematā and Maungawhau railway stations. Two new underground stations will be constructed to serve the city centre: Te Waihorotiu near Aotea Square and Karanga-a-Hape near Karangahape Road. Waitematā will be converted from a terminus station into a through station, and Mount Eden station will be replaced by Maungawhau station, a new station with four platforms to serve as an interchange between the new CRL line and the existing Western Line.

The current project is an adapted version of previous proposals to improve rail access to Auckland's city centre with the first proposals dating back to the 1920s. The increase in rail patronage in Auckland during the early 21st century, particularly after the opening of Britomart Transport Centre in 2003, led to renewed interest in the scheme. The 2012 Auckland Spatial Plan highlighted the CRL as the most important transport investment for Auckland and the project has enjoyed strong public support. Its planning and funding have also been the subject of controversy.

In June 2013, the central government announced its support for the project with a construction commencement date of 2020, four years later than Auckland Council's preferred start date of 2016. Prime Minister John Key announced in January 2016 that central government funding for the project had been confirmed, allowing Auckland Council to start construction of the main works from 2018, with central funds guaranteed to flow from 2020. Preliminary stages of construction, including the relocation of stormwater infrastructure and tunnelling in the vicinity of the Commercial Bay redevelopment, began in 2016. The City Rail Link is scheduled for completion in 2024.

History

1920s Morningside Deviation 
Serious planning schemes occurred as early as the 1920s. The tunnel was initially estimated at  length and at £0.6 million. In 1936, Dan Sullivan the Minister of Railways argued that the scheme – then known as the 'Morningside Tunnel' or the 'Morningside Deviation', after the proposed southern portal location – would cost approximately £1 million, with another £1 million required for the electrification of the network. He expressed doubts that the tunnel would ever pay purely from a rail point of view, though he acknowledged that there might be other benefits and wider aspects to take into account.

1970s rapid rail system 
The 1970s plans envisaged a loop connecting with Newmarket as part of a major rapid transit scheme proposed by Dove-Myer Robinson, mayor of Auckland City at the time. Two main stations were proposed: one downtown in the vicinity of the Queen Street/Shortland Street intersection, and a second midtown between Queen St and Mayoral Drive, about halfway between Aotea Square and Albert Park. A third city station was to be built at Karangahape Rd, but this would have been a stop on the western line only. The plan was undermined by Council staff, criticised by academics and opposed by the New Zealand Town Planning Institute, before finally being rejected in 1976 by the Muldoon National government, which considered it to be too costly.

An alternative plan was put forward by Auckland City Council planners in 1979, involving an overhead railway from the then Beach Road railway station to the Britomart bus station (today, site of Waitematā railway station). Auckland Mayor Sir Dove-Myer Robinson noted the central government had just spent $33 million for new Wellington suburban trains (the EM class Ganz-Mavag units) and the overhead railway scheme would "cost considerably less while providing a far greater potential." The Auckland Regional Authority supported the plan, although wanted to see more work done on a ground option as well.

2000s rail revival / Britomart 
In 2004, Auckland City Council prepared preliminary plans for an underground railway connecting Britomart Transport Centre to the Western Line in the vicinity of Mount Eden railway station and incorporating three new stations: near Aotea Square, Karangahape Road and the top of Symonds Street. The project would bring most of the city centre within a short walk of a station and increase the number of people living within a 30-minute train trip of the city centre by around 370,000.

The decision to electrify Auckland's rail network brought the tunnel back into focus as the key next step for developing Auckland's rail network. Estimates for the project's cost were around NZ$1.5 billion (or up to $2.4 billion according to other estimates), taking 12–16 years to plan and build.

On 5 March 2008, Auckland Regional Transport Authority (ARTA) announced preliminary planning for a 3.5 km tunnel between Britomart and Mount Eden, beneath Albert Street and including underground stations near Wellesley Street and Karangahape Road, with the Wellesley Street station, 18 m under the surface, potentially being larger and seeing more passengers than Britomart (projections of up to 7,700 per peak hour). By October 2008 ONTRACK said that it had reached an agreement in principle with the owners of Westfield Downtown (later rebranded as Downtown Shopping Centre) to allow the tunnel route to thread through the foundations of a proposed redevelopment of the site.

In 2009 and 2010, the discussion on the future tunnel gained much more prominence, with both candidates for the Mayoralty of the new Auckland Council, John Banks and Len Brown, making the tunnel part of their election platforms. Banks noted that it attracted cost-benefit returns much higher than many similar-sized roading projects, and would provide much enhanced, integrated access to the city centre. Brown also strongly supported the tunnel, and further, a rail connection to Auckland Airport, as part of a package of measures to double public transport patronage within 15 years. New Zealand's transport minister in 2010, Steven Joyce, warned Aucklanders not to engage in wishful thinking. The Minister's comments regarding the City Rail Link (and other rail investment), set in the context of the government's focus on delivering Roads of National Significance, has been considered politically risky – going against widespread opinion in Auckland that was in favour of better public transport. After ongoing and sustained lobbying by Brown to get central government support, the nickname "Len's loop" developed.

2010s designation and design 
In March 2010, KiwiRail/ARTA selected a preferred route with three stations: "Aotea" (beneath Albert St between Victoria Street and Wellesley St), "K Road" (beneath Pitt St adjacent to Karangahape Rd) and "Newton" (beneath upper Symonds St between the Khyber Pass Road/Newton Rd intersection and the New North Rd/Mt Eden Rd intersection), at an estimated cost range of $1 billion to $1.5 billion. In May 2011 the Government noted that after reviewing an initial business case for the project, it was unconvinced of the economic benefits of the tunnel. Minister of Transport Steven Joyce noted that he would not stand in the way of Auckland continuing planning and route designation work – if Auckland paid for it. In June 2011 Auckland Council voted to approve $2 million for planning and route protection for the tunnel, with Auckland Transport, rather than KiwiRail, undertaking the process.

In March 2012, Auckland Council decided to bring forward spending from the 2012–2013 budget, in order to continue progress protecting the eventual route. $6.3 million was spent on work including geotechnical surveys, utility and building assessments, contaminated site reports and rail operations modelling and $1.7m towards providing a revised business case, requested by the government.

In July 2012, as part of the works around designating the route, Auckland Council released footprints for four stations. This included designation space for a not previously considered station on the current Western Line, just west of Dominion Road. This station would serve as an interchange station for passengers wanting to travel east in the Newmarket direction, in case the tunnel was built without an "Eastern Link" at the southern end that would allow trains exiting it to turn east. The station was later dropped by Auckland Transport and the "Eastern Link" retained in the route protection documents.

In June 2013, the central government announced its support for the project, albeit with a later construction start date of 2020 rather than 2015. The government stated it would consider an earlier start date if Auckland's CBD employment and rail patronage growth hit thresholds faster than projected rates of growth.

On 8 July 2013, following the 10-year anniversary of the opening of the Britomart Transport Centre, it was announced that Auckland Council and the new owners of the Downtown Shopping Centre had agreed to discuss building a section of tunnel under the mall during a redevelopment planned for 2016–17. The section would be up to 100 metres long.

On 1 August 2014, Auckland Transport announced a significant design change to the project, dropping the underground Newton Station in favour of a significant upgrade to Mount Eden station. This change would save construction costs of $124 million, require fewer properties to be bought by Auckland Transport and in the long term save operational costs, with total savings being over $150 million. In addition, the change would allow Mount Eden station to be connected to the CRL, which previously bypassed it, and would separate the east–west junctions, meaning that rail lines would not need to cross each other. The Mount Eden CRL platforms would now be built in an open-air trench, similar to that at New Lynn station.

On 27 January 2016, Prime Minister John Key announced in his state of the nation address that central government funding for main works construction of the CRL had been confirmed and this would allow Auckland Council to start to construct the main works from 2018, with central funds guaranteed to flow from 2020. Commentary at the time reflected an opinion that this was a belated agreement to central government funding of the project by the ruling National Party, while the main opposition parliamentary parties (Labour Party, Greens and NZ First) had all been promising immediate construction timetables which were more closely aligned to the plans of the council.

City Rail Link Limited 
On 30 June 2017, Finance Minister Steven Joyce and Transport Minister Simon Bridges signed agreements with Auckland Mayor Phil Goff that established City Rail Link Limited (CRLL). Effective 1 July 2017, the company assumed responsibility for delivering the City Rail Link. Mr Joyce said that it was crucial that there be a single joint entity running the project and that CRLL was owned jointly by central and local government. Budget 2017 allocated $436 million to the City Rail Link project.

Capacity forecast forces platform enlargements 

As planned, the CRL's underground rail lines will have a capacity of 36,000 passengers per hour. That figure was expected to be reached in 2045. In July 2018, revised projections by City Rail Link Ltd (CRLL) showed the 36,000 capacity will be reached by 2035 – just 10 years after it opens. Although the trains are capable of having extra cars added in groups of three, the CRL station platforms, as originally specified, would not be long enough to accommodate nine-car trains. The proposed new capacity is 54,000 passengers per hour with the station platforms to be made longer so they can take the longer trains, and for an entry to be built at Beresford Square to complement Karanga a Hape station's Mercury Lane entrance. The extra cost could run to the "low hundreds of millions" and would prevent a costly future two-year closure if the platform lengthening retrofitting work was carried out after the CRL was opened.

Station naming 
In May 2022, the stations were gifted names by the CRL Mana Whenua Forum. These reflected the area's Māori history: Waitematā for Britomart, Te Wai Horotiu for Aotea, Karanga a Hape for Karangahape, and Maungawhau for Mt. Eden.

Together with Auckland Transport, City Rail Link Ltd submitted these suggested names to the New Zealand Geographic Board Ngā Pou Taunaha o Aotearoa (NZGB) for recognition. In August 2022, the Board returned the following verdicts: that the unofficial name 'Britomart' be altered to a new official name, 'Waitematā'; that the suggestion of 'Te Wai Horotiu' be accepted, and altered to 'Te Waihorotiu' in keeping with national and te reo Māori orthographic standards; that the suggestion of 'Karanga a Hape' be accepted, and altered to 'Karanga-a-Hape' in keeping with national and te reo Māori orthographic standards; that the unofficial name 'Mount Eden' be discarded, and replaced by an official dual name, 'Maungawhau / Mount Eden'.

In March 2023, the NZBG announced the decisions made by the Minister for Land Information Damien O'Connor. Te Wai Horotiu and Karanga a Hape were changed to Te Waihorotiu and Karanga-a-Hape respectively, as per the Board's recommendations. Britomart was also changed, to officially become Waitematā railway station. Breaking with the Board's recommendation, the Minister made the decision for the Mount Eden station to be called 'Maungawhau' only, not to have a dual name of 'Maungawhau / Mount Eden' as the board suggested.

Business case 

One of the most contentious aspects of the CRL is whether it is economically sensible to build it. The results vary widely depending on whether certain ancillary projects are included, whether one assumes economic benefits outside purely transport effects (such as increased land value) and depending on what length of time is assumed for the benefit calculation. In this regard, Council experts have highlighted that NZ calculation methods use a 30-year cut-off (i.e. for evaluation purposes, the tunnel provides no benefit after 30 years, even though much of Auckland's earlier rail and road infrastructure already serves for much longer than that). In comparison, if using evaluation periods of 50 years (used in Australia), or 60 years (used in the UK), the total project benefits for the city rail link have been estimated as up to 6 times higher than with the 30-year time frame.

The "City Centre Future Access Study" (CCFAS) was prepared by Auckland Transport and released in December 2012. The CCFAS analysed a number of different ways of improving access to Auckland's city centre and concluded that the CRL was essential, noting that bus-only investment will provide for short-term benefits but in some cases will be 'worse than doing nothing' for private vehicle travel times in the longer term. In July 2013, the Transport Agency's board agreed that transport projects were to be assessed for a 40-year evaluation period, but also reduced the discount rate from 8% to 6%.

Benefits 
The key benefits of the City Rail Link are intended to be:
 Turning Waitematā railway station from a terminus station into a through station, allowing more than twice the existing train capacity through the core of the network (from a maximum of 20 trains per hour, to be reached in 2016, to a projected 48 trains per hour), allowing trains to run every five minutes on the existing suburban lines
 Providing two new train stations, Te Wai Horotiu and Karanga a Hape, in the Auckland CBD, making most of the city centre easily accessible by train rapid transit and improving overall end to end trip times. This will boost economic activity and development in these areas and relieve projected transport access constraints
 Reducing the duration of trips on the Western Line significantly, by removing the need to deviate to Newmarket and around the east of the CBD 
 Allowing lines on opposite sides of the city to be through routed via the tunnel, providing direct crosstown rail connections
 Providing train capacity to allow new lines to be added to the network – including, but not limited to, other potential longer-term projects such as Airport Rail or North Shore Rail
 Doubling the number of Aucklanders who have 30 minutes duration rail access to the CBD
Increasing platform length at Waitematā station to accommodate 9 car trains (up from maximum 6 cars at present), and building the new stations with 9 car long platforms from the start
A study conducted in 2018, suggests that the City Rail Link will improve the accessibility to economic opportunities for people in the more deprived regions of south, east and west Auckland.

Cost estimates 
An estimated cost of $2.86 billion was often quoted for the project, but this cost was inflated out to the year of construction. The cost of the project in 2010 was $2.311 billion. That price also included not only the tunnel link with three stations (a deep-level Newton station was later dropped), but additional trains, duplication of the Onehunga Branch to two tracks and other small improvements to Auckland's rail network. These additional items are intended to further increase the capacity of Auckland's rail network when the rail link opens, the main benefit posed by the project.

In September 2016, the government formally confirmed its intention to fund its proposed share of 50% of the City Rail Link. The cost of the City Rail Link was then re-estimated to be between $2.8 and $3.4 billion, subject to tenders for remaining contracts.

In mid-April 2019, it was revealed that the cost of the project had risen by more than $1 billion to $4.419 billion.

Proposed timeline 
In February 2012, Auckland Council published the following proposed project timeline for the City Rail Link:
2010 Initial study for CRL project and potential route for protection
2011 Review of initial study; further feasibility investigations; project team established
2012 Confirm route for CRL
2013 Notice of Requirement (NOR) and consent applications; property purchase
2014 Begin tender process for project
2015–20 Construction
2020/21 CRL opens

This timeline will not be adhered to, as completion has been rescheduled to 2024.
CRL Chief Executive, Dr Sean Sweeney stated on the CRL website in late 2021 that the effects of Covid are "highly likely (to mean) there will be significant consequences for the project in terms of cost and completion" and these would become clearer late 2022 or early 2023.

Construction methods 
The City Rail Link was constructed using both cut-and-cover and tunnel boring machine (TBM) methods depending on the location of construction. The ground through which the tunnels were built varies between rock and soft soil, and with a variation in depth to natural ground level of between 40 metres and 0 metres. Cut and cover construction occurred around the existing Mount Eden railway station and in the suburb of Eden Terrace, forming the junction of the City Rail Link to the North Auckland Line. North of the junction, twin bored tunnels then extend as far as Mayoral Drive. Another section of cut and cover tunnel then extends north underneath Albert Street, before turning east to head underneath the redeveloped Downtown Shopping Centre and into Waitematā. The public got a look inside the tunnels in November 2019.

The line was mainly bored through East Coast Bays Formation of sandstones and siltstones. It is expected that 2 million tonnes of spoil will be dug out from 2020 and it has been proposed to use it to double the single track section of the North Island Main Trunk line across Whangamarino wetland.

Some landowners around Albert Street, including the Ministry of Justice which owns and operates the Auckland District Court on Albert Street, expressed concern that construction of the cut and cover tunnel would disrupt foot and vehicular traffic along Albert Street over a period of two years with several intersections along the street being closed for up to 18 months. The Department of Corrections also expressed concern that grade-separating the Normanby Road level crossing (as part of the cut and cover works at the southern end of the project) would cut off access to Mount Eden Prisons.

Construction 
On 7 April 2015, two construction consortia were awarded the contracts to start the first construction phase of the city rail link.
Construction of the early works package between Britomart and Wyndham Street started in October 2015. The Downer joint venture (Downer NZ and Soletanche Bachy) was chosen to design the rail link work through and under Waitematā Station and Queen St to Precinct Properties' Downtown Shopping Centre site, and construction started in early 2016. The Connectus consortium (McConnell Dowell and Hawkins) will construct the cut and cover tunnels under and along Albert St from Customs St to Wyndham St. The work started in October 2015 with the relocation of a major stormwater line in Albert St between Swanson and Wellesley Sts. Construction of these sections of the city rail link tunnels will coincide with Precinct Properties redevelopment of the Downtown Shopping Centre site, due to open by mid-2019.

The Downtown Shopping Centre was closed on 28 May 2016 and by 23 November had been demolished. It will be replaced with a 36-storey skyscraper which will include a new shopping centre in the lower levels. Auckland Council and proprietors Precinct Properties struck a deal to include tunnels for the City Rail Link directly underneath the premises.

In early December 2020, Mayor of Auckland Phil Goff unveiled a massive tunnel boring machine that would be used to drill two 1.6 km long tunnels from the Mount Eden railway station to central Auckland as part of the City Rail Link. The TBM was named after Māori leader Dame Whina Cooper. On 14 September 2022 the TBM Dame Whina Cooper broke through into the station box of Te Waihorotiu Station, completing the second of the two tunnels needed for the project. Tracklaying was then commenced by Martinus Rail, who use battery-electric locomotives based at Quay Park junction.

Waitematā station 

Following completion of the CRL, some trains will no longer terminate at Waitematā. Platforms 1 and 5 will be the through platforms, while platforms 2, 3 and 4 will remain terminating platforms.

Te Waihorotiu station 

Karanga-a-Hape station 

This station will be  underground. There will be an entrance on Mercury Lane, with early plans making provision for an entrance that would be added later on Beresford Square. Assessments of passenger numbers in 2018 indicated that longer trains and platforms would be needed earlier, and a decision was made to lengthen the platforms so as to incorporate the Beresford Square entrance from the outset.

Demolition of buildings on Mercury Lane began on 4 November 2019. Demolition at this site will be done in two phases, with completion expected in April 2020. Demolition of buildings at the Beresford Square site was expected to take three years.

Maungawhau station 

In October 2019, demolition of 30 buildings in the vicinity of this station began. This first stage of three phases of demolition is expected to be completed in March 2020.

Proposed train services 

While the train network for the period following the completion of the CRL has not been finalised, Auckland Transport has released a preliminary plan. The plan proposes changes to the routing of the Western and Southern Line and introduces a new service which links West Auckland to South Auckland without passing through Waitematā station. If the plan is adopted, the Western Line and Southern Line will be rerouted through the new Aotea Square and Karangahape Road stations and no longer service Parnell Station. At the Waitematā through station, the Western Line will continue as the Onehunga Line while the Southern Line will continue as the Eastern Line and vice versa. The proposed new line will service a subset of the Western Line and Southern Line stations, from Henderson to Otahuhu and pass through the Maungawhau, Grafton and Newmarket stations in the city centre.

In early 2022, the Auckland Light Rail group released an Indicative Business Case appendix containing a new post-CRL operating plan. This plan now proposes that the Western and Eastern Lines be connected through the CRL, and the Southern Line remains standalone, looping anticlockwise around the Newmarket Line and CRL, doubling back upon itself as far as Ōtāhuhu station. The Onehunga Line ceases to run into the city, instead heading west from Newmarket to Henderson. Lastly, a half-hourly Waitematā to Pukekohe express service via Panmure is also included. 

In late November 2022, this draft plan was seemingly confirmed during an Auckland Council Transport and Infrastructure Committee presentation. The Crosstown-Onehunga line has been cut back to just a Newmarket-Onehunga line. This operating pattern may be subject to change with further modelling and public consultation, however.

Public opinion 
A public opinion poll published on 27 June 2012 found 63% of Aucklanders surveyed are in favour of the tunnel, 29% were against it and 8% didn't care. The poll was conducted by Research New Zealand.

Another poll in November showed similar support amongst Aucklanders at 64%. Only 14% overall opposed the building of the rail link; 18% are neutral. Support was lowest in those areas not served directly by rail. The same number of those who support it want it built as soon as possible, while 22% of supporters want it built by 2020. Over 50% of respondents wanted the central Government to contribute significantly to the cost of the project, with 30% of respondents overall supporting road tolling to pay for the project. One quarter of respondents overall supported "targeted rates".

See also 
 Public transport in Auckland
 Rail transport in New Zealand
 List of Auckland railway stations

Similar projects elsewhere in Oceania
 Cross River Rail, Brisbane
 Metro Tunnel, Melbourne
 Sydney Metro inner-city section

References

External links 
City Rail Link (Official City Rail Link project website)
Auckland Transport Blog (City Rail Link page)
Campaign for Better Transport Forum  (City Rail Link Topic Page)

Rail transport in Auckland
Railway tunnels in New Zealand
Proposed railway tunnels in Oceania
Proposed railway lines in New Zealand
Transport in Auckland
Proposed tunnels in New Zealand
Underground commuter rail
2024 in rail transport
Transport buildings and structures in the Auckland Region
Auckland CBD